Selenothrips is a genus of thrips in the family Thripidae, first described in 1911 by Heinrich Hugo Karny. There are at least two described species in Selenothrips.

Species
These two species belong to the genus Selenothrips:
 Selenothrips glabratus Priesner, 1927
 Selenothrips rubrocinctus (Giard, 1901) (red-banded thrips)

References

Further reading

 
 
 
 
 
 

Thripidae
Articles created by Qbugbot
Taxa named by Heinrich Hugo Karny
Taxa described in 1911